Universal Hydrogen is a company co-founded by Paul Eremenko and Jon Gordon, working towards hydrogen-powered flight.  A maiden flight of a partially-hydrogen-powered Dash 8 aircraft, with MagniX's Magni650 as EPU, took place on March 2, 2023; the flight demonstration represented the largest aircraft ever to cruise mainly on hydrogen power.

References

 
Aviation and the environment